Alfred Hugh Beresford Conroy (7 April 1864 – 28 November 1920) was an Australian politician. Born in Winchelsea, Victoria, he was educated at Hawthorn Grammar School in Melbourne. Becoming a bank clerk and surveyor, he moved to Goulburn in New South Wales in 1883. In 1893 he became a barrister, and he was an alderman on Goulburn Council. In 1901, he was elected to the Australian House of Representatives as the inaugural member for Werriwa, representing the Free Trade Party. In 1906, he was defeated by Labor candidate David Hall, but in 1913 he was returned to the Parliament, again as the member for Werriwa but this time representing the Commonwealth Liberal Party. He was defeated again in 1914, and retired, dying in 1920.

References

Free Trade Party members of the Parliament of Australia
Commonwealth Liberal Party members of the Parliament of Australia
Members of the Australian House of Representatives for Werriwa
Members of the Australian House of Representatives
1864 births
1920 deaths
20th-century Australian politicians
Burials at Gore Hill Cemetery